Behnam House is a historical building in Tabriz, Iran. The edifice was built during the later part of the Zand dynasty (1750–1794) and the early part of the Qajar dynasty (1781–1925), as a residential house.

During the reign of Nasereddin Shah Qajar (1848–1896) this building was substantially renovated and embellished with ornamental paintings. The house consists of a main building, referred to as the Winter Building, and a smaller structure, referred to as the Summer Building. The Winter Building is a two-storey symmetrical construction standing on a basement. Like many traditional houses in Iran, this house has an inner (اندرونی, andaruni) and an outer (بيرونی, biruni) courtyard, the former being the larger of the two. In the course of a 2009 renovation project, some hitherto unknown miniature frescoes were discovered in this house which were restored by specialists. The Behnām House is part of the School of Architecture of Tabriz Art University.

Gallery

Location
The Behnām House is located in the city center of Tabriz, Maqsudiyeh Street, behind Tabriz Municipality.

References

External links

  Editorial Board, East Azarbaijan Geography, Iranian Ministry of Education, 2000
 http://www.eachto.ir

Houses in Iran
Architecture in Iran
Buildings and structures in Tabriz
Buildings of the Qajar period